The boys' sprint freestyle cross-country skiing competition at the 2020 Winter Youth Olympics was held on 19 January at the Vallée de Joux Cross-Country Centre.

Results

Qualifying
The qualifying was held at 12:30.

Quarterfinals
Quarterfinal 1

Quarterfinal 2

Quarterfinal 3

Quarterfinal 4

Quarterfinal 5

Semifinals
Semifinal 1

Semifinal 2

Final
The final was held at 15:32.

References

Boys' sprint